Codex 0308 (in the Gregory-Aland numbering), is one of the recently registered New Testament Greek uncial manuscripts. It consists of only a fragment of a single parchment leaf of a fourth-century codex, containing portions of the eleventh chapter of the Book of Revelation.

Description 

The surviving texts of Revelation are verses 11:15-16 and 11:17-18; they are in fragmentary condition. 
Uncial 0308 measures  with the surviving leaf having 11 lines out of an original 14 (see reconstruction below). The text was written one column to a page, though line lengths were irregular. The letters Ε (epsilon) and Θ (theta) have an extended middle line, and they are similar to those from Codex Washingtonianus. These characters appear influenced by the shape of Coptic letters. The nomina sacra attested in this uncial fragment are ΚΣ (Kurios, Lord) and ΧΡΣ) (Christos, Christ). The number "twenty four" is also written using an abbreviation — ΚΔ. All the abbreviations are marked with the superscript bar.

Text 
 

Although the text of the codex is too brief to determine its textual character, it concurs with both Codex Sinaiticus and with 𝔓47 (Papyrus 47), with one exception. In Rev 11:16 it has the textual variant , agreeing with Codex Alexandrinus, Uncial 051 and A against καθηνται—𝔓47 and Codex Ephraemi—also οι καθηνται—Sinaiticus and K. In Rev 11:17 it has , a variant supported by: 𝔓47, א, C and 2344. In Re 11:18 it has textual variant "" (like: Sinaiticus and 𝔓47), Textus Receptus and NA27 have: "". It differs two times with NA27 (και used 2 times more). The text of the codex was published by W. E. H. Cockle in 1999. 

It is cataloged among the Oxyrhynchus Papyri as P. Oxy. 4500, and is now part of the Sackler Library collection in Oxford.

See also 
 List of New Testament uncials
 Revelation 11

References

Further reading 
 W. E. H. Cockle, "4500. Revelation XI 15–16; 17–18", The Oxyrhynchus Papyri LXVI (London: Egypt Exploration Society, 1999).

External links

Images 
 P.Oxy. LXVI 4500 from Oxford University's official papyrology website "POxy: Oxyrhynchus Online"

Official registration 
 "Continuation of the Manuscript List", Institute for New Testament Textual Research, University of Münster. Retrieved April 9, 2008

Greek New Testament uncials
4th-century biblical manuscripts
4500